Senator Poole may refer to:

Phil Poole (born 1959), Alabama State Senate
Van B. Poole (born 1935), Florida State Senate

See also
John Pool (1826–1884), U.S. Senator from North Carolina from 1868 to 1873